Fuscidea appalachensis is a species of saxicolous (rock-dwelling) in the family Fuscideaceae. Found in North America, it was formally described as a new species in 2008 by lichenologist Alan Fryday. Here it was found growing on damp rocks on the side of the gully. The lichen contains divaricatic acid, a secondary compound that can be detected using thin-layer chromatography. The specific epithet alludes to the range of the lichen—the Appalachian Mountains in eastern North America, ranging from New Brunswick to Tennessee at the southern end.

References

Umbilicariales
Lichen species
Lichens described in 2008
Lichens of Eastern Canada
Lichens of the United States
Fungi without expected TNC conservation status